Ordinary Heroes may refer to:

Ordinary Heroes (album), an album by Howard Jones
Ordinary Heroes (novel), a novel by Scott Turow
Ordinary Heroes (book), a World War II book by Steve Wagner and Sharon Wells Wagner
Ordinary Heroes (1986 film), an American film directed by Peter H. Cooper
Ordinary Heroes (1999 film), a Hong Kong film directed by Ann Hui